Trigona hypogea  is a species of stingless bee from the Neotropics; it is unusual in that it is one of only three known species of bee that exclusively uses carrion as a protein source, rather than pollen, earning it the nickname "vulture bee". These bees consume flesh, carry it internally back to the colony, and regurgitate it along with other secretions into storage pots similar to those used by other bee species to store honey; the larvae are fed on this substance, while the adult bees consume the honey.

References

hypogea
Insects described in 1902